TKMM College or T.K.Madhava Memorial College is a college in Alappuzha district. It is situated on a vast 25-acre campus, 2 kilometers to the south of Haripad bus stand, on the eastern side of National Highway 47.

External links 
 

Colleges in Kerala
Universities and colleges in Alappuzha district